Brigadier Hector Cyril Daniel  (1898– 28 December 1953) was a South African military commander.  He served in the Royal Air Force in World War I, becoming an ace with nine aerial victories, and joined the South African Air Force in 1923.

He was Director of Air and Technical Services, i.e. head of the SAAF, from 1937 until the outbreak of World War II in 1939, when he was appointed Officer Commanding SAAF Headquarters. During the war, he was Inspector of the SAAF in 1940, senior SAAF officer in East Africa from 1940 to 1941, and Air Officer Commanding 24 Group from 1941.

Brigadier Daniel retired in 1953. He died by his own hand.

Military honors

Military Cross (MC)
T./2nd Lt. Hector Daniel, Gen. List and R.A.F.

For conspicuous gallantry and devotion to duty in numerous aerial encounters. On one occasion he completely destroyed three enemy aeroplanes on the same day. He has in addition crashed three others and sent down two out of control. He has always displayed the greatest skill, keenness and courage in aerial fighting, and his services have been of inestimable value to his patrol leader.

See also
List of South African military chiefs
South African Air Force

References

|-

1898 births
1953 deaths
People from Setsoto Local Municipality
White South African people
South African Air Force generals
South African military personnel of World War II
Recipients of the Military Cross
Recipients of the Air Force Cross (United Kingdom)
Suicides in South Africa
Military personnel who committed suicide
South African Commanders of the Order of the British Empire
South African World War I flying aces
Graduates of the Staff College, Camberley